James Frost Wright (1 April 1863 – 4 October 1932) was an English rugby union footballer who played in the 1890s. He played at representative level for England, and at club level for Bradford F.C., as a half-back, i.e. number 9, or 10. Prior to Tuesday 27 August 1895, Bradford F.C. was a rugby union club, it then became a rugby league club, and since 1907 it has been the association football (soccer) club Bradford Park Avenue.

Background
James Wright was born in Bradford/Bramham, West Riding of Yorkshire (see note), and he died aged 69 in Blackpool, Lancashire, England.

Playing career

International honours 
James Wright won a cap for England while at Bradford F.C. in 1890 against Wales.

Change of Code 
When Bradford F.C. converted from the rugby union code to the rugby league code on Tuesday 27 August 1895, James Wright would have been 32. Consequently, he could have been both a rugby union and rugby league footballer for Bradford F.C.

Genealogical information 
James Wright's marriage was registered during third ¼ 1886 in Bradford district.

Note 
espnscrum.com states James Wright's birthplace as being Bradford, whereas FreeBMD.com quotes it as being registered 20-miles away in Bramham.

References

External links 
 Search for "Wright" at rugbyleagueproject.org
 Biography of Richard Thomas Dutton Budworth with an England team photograph including James Wright

1863 births
1932 deaths
Bradford F.C. players
England international rugby union players
English rugby league players
English rugby union players
Rugby league players from Bradford
Rugby union halfbacks
Rugby union players from Bradford